The Very Air We Breathe is the first album from Pop punk/Electronica band Driver side impact released in 2007, under Victory Records. It mixes elements of Punk, Post-hardcore, shoegaze, and electronica.

Track listing

"Introduction" – 1:15
"Your Time To Shine" – 3:53
"The Heist" – 3:31
"Reasons We Sleep" – 4:04
"Made Of Gold" – 3:49
"Our Lives In Slow Motion" – 4:21
"Cadence And Cascade" – 1:20
"Cowboys And Indians" – 3:13
"We Are Your Own" – 5:07
"Life Like The Movies" – 5:02
"Walk The Plank" – 4:14
"Tonight...We Dance!" – 4:32
"The Artist" – 4:13

2007 albums